Aurangzeb Mosque is an ancient Islamic place of worship and archeological site located in the village of Shalangka in the Pakundia Upazila of Bangladesh's Kishoreganj District.

History 

The historic mosque is located in the village of Shalangka in Narandi Union. It was constructed during the reign of Mughal emperor Aurangzeb, from whom it gets its name. Shaykh Muhammad Hanif, a muhaddith in Aurangzeb's royal court, was granted a jagir (land grant) of 62 mouzas from the emperor for his services. Under Aurangzeb's instruction, Hanif moved from Delhi to Eastern Bengal and established a zamindari in this region. The foundations of this mosque were established by Hanif in 1669. The Department of Archaeology (now under the Government of Bangladesh) listed it as one of the architectural sites to be preserved in 1909.

Infrastructure 
The mosque is built on a high ground with four pillars having large octagons at the four corners of this quadrilateral mosque. There are three entrances on the eastern wall of the mosque, of which the central entrance is relatively large. Above the entrance there is a wonderful prayer carved in white stone. Also there are two entrances, one in the north wall and one in the south wall. The Aurangzeb Mosque has one dome.

Gallery

See also 

 List of archaeological sites in Bangladesh
 List of mosques in Bangladesh

References 

Archaeological sites in Kishoreganj district
Pakundia Upazila
1669 establishments
Mosques completed in 1669